Cameron Reid Beckman (born February 15, 1970) is an American professional golfer who plays on the PGA Tour Champions. He was previously a member of the PGA Tour, where he was a three-time winner. 

Beckman was born in Minneapolis, Minnesota and was raised in the Twin Cities' suburb of Burnsville. He graduated from Burnsville Senior High School in 1988. He attended Texas Lutheran University, where he majored in Art and was a member of the golf team. Beckman was the 1991 NAIA individual champion. He graduated and turned pro in 1993.

Beckman was the 1994 Lone Star Tour Player of the Year. He earned his first win on the PGA Tour at the Southern Farm Bureau Classic in 2001. Seven years later, at the 2008 Frys.com Open at the Greyhawk Golf Club in Scottsdale, Arizona, Beckman shot a final round 63 to force a playoff against Kevin Sutherland. Beckman won the tournament with a par on the second playoff hole to get his second PGA Tour win and secure his card for the 2009 and 2010 PGA Tour seasons. He earned his third PGA Tour title at the 2010 Mayakoba Golf Classic with a two-stroke win over 54-hole leader Joe Durant and Tour rookie Brian Stuard. Beckman finished with a three-under-par 67. The event was held at the Mayakoba Resort in Playa del Carmen, Mexico.

Beckman lives with his family in San Antonio, Texas.

In July 2021, Beckman won the Dick's Sporting Goods Open in Endicott, New York, defeating Ernie Els by one stroke. This win gave him full status on the PGA Tour Champions until 2022. This was his first win in 4,151 days, since he won the Mayakoba Golf Classic on the PGA Tour in 2010.

Professional wins (5)

PGA Tour wins (3)

PGA Tour playoff record (1–1)

Other wins (1)
1998 Texas State Open

PGA Tour Champions wins (1)

Results in major championships

Note: Beckman never played in the Masters Tournament.

CUT = missed the half-way cut
"T" = tied

Results in The Players Championship

CUT = missed the halfway cut
WD = withdrew
"T" indicates a tie for a place

Results in World Golf Championships

"T" = Tied

Results in senior major championships

CUT = missed the halfway cut
"T" indicates a tie for a place

See also
1998 PGA Tour Qualifying School graduates
1999 PGA Tour Qualifying School graduates
2000 PGA Tour Qualifying School graduates
2006 PGA Tour Qualifying School graduates

References

External links

American male golfers
PGA Tour golfers
PGA Tour Champions golfers
Golfers from Minneapolis
Golfers from San Antonio
People from Burnsville, Minnesota
1970 births
Living people